"She's So Fine" is a song written by Stevie Wright and George Young. It was originally recorded by the Australian rock group the Easybeats in 1965, whose version reached number three in the Australian charts.

Background

The basic tracks to "She's So Fine" were recorded in early 1965 at Armstrong Studios in Melbourne.  Additional recording took place later when they returned to Sydney.   The single was a break-though hit for the Easybeats, gaining them nationwide attention.

Single track listing

She's So Fine
Old Oak Tree

Charts

References

1965 singles
1965 songs
The Easybeats songs
Songs written by Stevie Wright (Australian singer)
Songs written by George Young (rock musician)
Parlophone singles
Albert Productions singles